The Wonegizi Nature Conservation Unit is a proposed nature reserve in Liberia.

References

Protected areas of Liberia
Protected areas established in 1987
Lofa County
1987 establishments in Liberia